Kirkorov (Bulgarian or Russian: Киркоров) is a Bulgarian masculine surname, its feminine counterpart is Kirkorova. It may refer to
Bedros Kirkorov (born 1932), Bulgarian-Russian singer and bandleader
Kirkor Kirkorov (born 1968), Bulgarian boxer
Philipp Kirkorov (born 1967), Russian pop singer of Armenian-Bulgarian origin, son of Bedros

Bulgarian-language surnames